Shant may refer to:
Shant TV, a private television broadcasting company in Armenia
Levon Shant otherwise Լեւոն Շանթ, Levon Nahashbedian, Levon Seghposian (1869–1951), Armenian playwright
Shant Kenderian, Iraqi-born United States citizen who became an American prisoner-of-war